Putative neuropeptide Y receptor type 6 is a protein that in humans is encoded by the NPY6R gene.

References

Further reading